The Chargers–Chiefs rivalry is an American football rivalry between the National Football League (NFL)'s Los Angeles Chargers and Kansas City Chiefs. Since the American Football League (AFL) was established in 1960, the Chargers and the Chiefs have shared the same division, first being the AFL Western Conference, and since the AFL–NFL merger, the American Football Conference (AFC) West.

Kansas City is one of four teams with a winning record against all of their divisional opponents with 100-plus head-to-head games played (along with the Dallas Cowboys, Green Bay Packers, and Miami Dolphins).  The Los Angeles Chargers are one of only three teams with a losing record against all of their divisional opponents with 100-plus head-to-head games played (along with the Detroit Lions and New York Jets).  This holds true as of the end of the 2022 season.

Notable games

1960s 
Season: 1960 (Week 1)
Score: Dallas Texans 20–21 Los Angeles Chargers
Notability: The first regular season game for both franchises. Dallas led 20–7 after three quarters, but Jack Kemp ran for one touchdown and threw for another in a comeback win.

Season: 1964 (Week 14)
Score: Kansas City Chiefs 49–6 San Diego Chargers
Notability: Kansas City's 43-point win represents the widest margin of victory in the series. San Diego came into the game having already clinched the division, but turned the ball over six times. Len Dawson completed 17 of 28 passes for 220 yards, 4 touchdowns and no interceptions.

1970s 
Season: 1975 (Week 12)
Score: San Diego Chargers 28–20 Kansas City Chiefs
Notability: San Diego entered the game with an 0–11 record, but defeated the 5–6 Chiefs to avoid a winless season. They scored fourteen unanswered points in the final quarter; quarterback Dan Fouts was intercepted three times but scored the clinching touchdown on a 9-yard run.

Season: 1978 (Week 11)
Score: Kansas City Chiefs 23–29 (OT) San Diego Chargers
Notability: Won by a Charger touchdown as time expired in overtime. San Diego reached the Kansas City 14 near the end of the extra period, then almost ran out of time when Fouts mistook the play clock for the game clock. Fouts found John Jefferson in the back of the end zone for the game-winner as the last seconds ran off.

1980s 
Season: 1985 (Week 16)
Score: San Diego Chargers 34–38 Kansas City Chiefs
Notability: Stephone Paige broke the NFL single-season receiving yards record. Paige caught 8 passes for 309 yards and two touchdowns – a 56-yarder from Todd Blackledge and an 84-yarder from Bill Kenney. Kansas City led 35–3 in the 2nd quarter and 38–13 early in the final quarter, before three unanswered Charger touchdowns left them just short of a comeback win.

Season: 1986 (Week 7)
Score: San Diego Chargers 41–42 Kansas City Chiefs
Notability: The highest-scoring game in the series. The Chiefs scored three return touchdowns in the second quarter, twice on interceptions by Lloyd Burress and once from a fumble recovered by Kevin Ross; Leslie O'Neal added an interception return touchdown for San Diego in the same quarter. The Chargers went on to outgain Kansas City by 512 offensive yards to 222, but still lost when kicker Rolf Benirschke missed a 35-yard field goal in the final minute.

1990s 
Season: 1992 (Wildcard playoffs)
Score: Kansas City Chiefs 0–17 San Diego Chargers
Notability: To date, the only playoff meeting between the teams. In rainy conditions, neither team scored in the opening half. Marion Butts opened the scoring in the 3rd quarter with a 54-yard touchdown run, and the Charger defense completed the shutout. Kansas City had swept the Chargers during the regular season, but finished with a 10–6 record to the Chargers' 11–5, hence the playoff game took place in San Diego.

Season: 1995 (Week 6)
Score: San Diego Chargers 23–29 (OT) Kansas City Chiefs
Notability: Tamarick Vanover scored the first overtime punt return touchdown in NFL history. In a close-fought Monday Night Football game, San Diego led 23–16 after a John Carney field goal with barely a minute left, before Steve Bono led a quick touchdown drive to force overtime. Vanover won the game in the extra period when he took a Darren Bennett punt back 86 yards for a touchdown.

Season: 1998 (Week 3)
Score: San Diego Chargers 7–23 Kansas City Chiefs
Notability: Rookie Ryan Leaf produced a passer rating of zero in his third start for the Chargers, having won the first two. Leaf finished with 1 completion from 15 attempts, for 4 yards, no touchdowns and three interceptions. He also lost three fumbles and was sacked twice for the loss of 23 yards.

2000s 
Season: 2000 (Week 13)
Score: Kansas City Chiefs 16–17 San Diego Chargers
Notability: As they had done in 1975, the 0–11 Chargers beat the 5–6 Chiefs to end the prospect of a winless season. Leaf threw two touchdowns to Freddie Jones in the first half to put San Diego up 14–3, but had an interception run back for a touchdown in the second half as Kansas City came back to lead 16–14. Carney converted a 54-yard field goal with two minutes left, and San Diego won when Warren Moon threw incomplete on 4th down.

Season: 2001 (Week 8)
Score: Kansas City Chiefs 20–25 San Diego Chargers
Notability: Quarterback Drew Brees, a future Super Bowl MVP, made his NFL debut for the Chargers after Doug Flutie was injured. Brees entered the game 16–0 behind; the deficit became 19–0 before he led the Chargers to 20 unanswered points. Kansas City responded with a game-winning Tony Richardson touchdown run in the final two minutes. Brees completed 15 of 27 passes for 221 yards, with a touchdown and no interceptions.

Season: 2006 (Week 15)
Score: Kansas City Chiefs 20–25 San Diego Chargers
Notability: LaDainian Tomlinson broke the NFL single-season records for rushing touchdowns (28) and points scored (186). He also extended his single-season record for tital touchdowns to 31, while rushing 25 times for 199 yards, and scoring on runs of 15 and 85 yards.

Season: 2008 (Week 15)
Score: San Diego Chargers 22–21 Kansas City Chiefs
Notability: The Chargers (5–8 entering the game) would have been eliminated from playoff contention with a loss, and Kansas City (2–11) led 21–3 in the 3rd quarter. The score was still 21–10 entering the final two minutes, but Philip Rivers threw two touchdowns either side of a successful onside kick, for a one-point lead. Chiefs kicker Connor Barth missed a 50-yard field goal as time expired, and San Diego eventually won the AFC West.

2010s 
Season: 2013 (Week 17)
Score: Kansas City Chiefs 24–27 (OT) San Diego Chargers
Notability: San Diego needed a win or tie to make the playoffs. The Chiefs, who had already clinched a playoff berth, rested many of their starters, but still led 24–14 entering the final quarter. After the Chargers tied the game, Chiefs kicker Ryan Succop had a chance to eliminate them , but missed a 41-yard field goal with 4 seconds left, and San Diego won in overtime.

Season: 2014 (Week 17)
Score: San Diego Chargers 7–19 Kansas City Chiefs
Notability: At 9–6, San Diego needed a win to make the playoffs against the 8–7 Chiefs, who had a small chance of qualifying. The Kansas City defense sacked Rivers seven times and intercepted him twice, and Chiefs tight end Travis Kelce recovered a teammate's fumble in the end zone to help them lead by twelve points. San Diego drove into Kansas City territory on their final four drives but failed to score on any of them. Both sides missed the playoffs.

Season: 2016 (Week 1)
Score: San Diego Chargers 27–33 (OT) Kansas City Chiefs
Notability: The Chiefs came back from 21 points down to win in overtime. Melvin Gordon scored twice as San Diego took a 24–3 lead with six minutes to play in the 3rd quarter, but Alex Smith converted two 4th downs and threw two touchdowns as Kansas City came back to tie. Smith ran for the winning score himself on the first drive of overtime. He finished with 34 completions from 48 attempts, for 363 yards, two touchdowns and an interception.

2020s 

Season: 2022 (Week 2)
Score: Los Angeles Chargers 24-27 Kansas City Chiefs
Notability: Los Angeles and Kansas City played in the first Thursday Night Football game broadcast nationally and exclusively on Amazon Prime Video.

Season-by-season results 

|-
| 1960
| Tie 1–1
| style="| Chargers  21–20
| style="| Texans  17–0
| Tie  1–1
| Inaugural season for both franchises and the AFL.  Chargers lose 1960 AFL Championship.
|-
| 1961
| style="| 
| style="| Chargers  24–14
| style="| Chargers  26–10
| Chargers  3–1
| Chargers move to San Diego after playing first season in Los Angeles.  Chargers lose 1961 AFL Championship.
|-
| 1962
| Tie 1–1
| style="| Chargers  32–28
| style="| Texans  26–17
| Chargers  4–2
| 
|-
| 1963
| style="| 
| style="| Chargers  24–10
| style="| Chargers  38–17
| Chargers  6–2
| Texans move to Kansas City and become the Chiefs.  Chargers win 1963 AFL Championship.
|-
| 1964
| Tie 1–1
| style="| Chiefs  49–6
| style="| Chargers  28–14
| Chargers  7–3
| Chargers lose 1964 AFL Championship.
|-
| 1965
| style="| 
| Tie  10–10
| style="| Chiefs  31–7
| Chargers  7–4–1
| Only tie game in the history of the rivalry.  Chargers lose 1965 AFL Championship.
|-
| 1966
| style="| 
| style="| Chiefs  27–14
| style="| Chiefs  24–14
| Chargers  7–6–1
| Chiefs win 1966 AFL Championship, lose Super Bowl I.
|-
| 1967
| style="| 
| style="| Chargers  45–31
| style="| Chargers  17–16
| Chargers  9–6–1
| Chargers open San Diego Stadium.
|-
| 1968
| style="| 
| style="| Chiefs  40–3
| style="| Chiefs  27–20
| Chargers  9–8–1
| 
|-
| 1969
| style="| 
| style="| Chiefs  27–9
| style="| Chiefs  27–3
| Chiefs  10–9–1
| Chiefs win 1969 AFL Championship and Super Bowl IV.
|-

|-
| 
| Tie 1–1
| style="| Chargers  31–13
| style="| Chiefs  26–14
| Chiefs  11–10–1
| AFL-NFL merger.  Both teams placed in the AFC West.
|-
| 
| Tie 1–1
| style="| Chargers  21–14
| style="| Chiefs  31–10
| Chiefs  12–11–1
|
|-
| 
| Tie 1–1
| style="| Chiefs  26–14
| style="| Chargers  27–17
| Chiefs  13–12–1
|
|-
| 
| style="| 
| style="| Chiefs  19–0
| style="| Chiefs  33–6
| Chiefs  15–12–1
| 
|-
| 
| Tie 1–1
| style="| Chiefs  24–14
| style="| Chargers  14–7
| Chiefs  16–13–1
| 
|-
| 
| Tie 1–1
| style="| Chiefs  12–10
| style="| Chargers  28–20
| Chiefs  17–14–1
| 
|-
| 
| Tie 1–1
| style="| Chiefs  23–20
| style="| Chargers  30–16
| Chiefs  18–15–1
| 
|-
| 
| Tie 1–1
| style="| Chiefs  21–16
| style="| Chargers  23–7
| Chiefs  19–16–1
| Away team wins eight straight meetings from 1974 to 1977.
|-
| 
| Tie 1–1
| style="| Chargers  29–23(OT)
| style="| Chiefs  23–0
| Chiefs  20–17–1
| 
|-
| 
| style="| 
| style="| Chargers  28–7
| style="| Chargers  20–14
| Chiefs  20–19–1
| 
|-

|-
| 
| style="| 
| style="| Chargers  20–7
| style="| Chargers  24–7
| Chargers  21–20–1
| 
|-
| 
| style="| 
| style="| Chargers  22–20
| style="| Chargers  42–31
| Chargers  23–20–1
| 
|-
| 
| style="| 
| no game
| style="| Chiefs  19–12
| Chargers  23–21–1
| Game in San Diego cancelled as a result of the Players strike reducing season to 9 games.
|-
| 
| style="| 
| style="| Chargers  41–38
| style="| Chargers  17–13
| Chargers  25–21–1
| 
|-
| 
| style="| 
| style="| Chiefs  42–21
| style="| Chiefs  31–13
| Chargers  25–23–1
| 
|-
| 
| Tie 1–1
| style="| Chargers  31–20
| style="| Chiefs  38–34
| Chargers  26–24–1
| 
|-
| 
| style="| 
| style="| Chiefs  24–23
| style="| Chiefs  42–41
| Tie  26–26–1
| 
|-
| 
| Tie 1–1
| style="| Chargers  42–21
| style="| Chiefs  20–13
| Tie  27–27–1
| 
|-
| 
| style="| 
| style="| Chargers  24–13
| style="| Chargers  24–23
| Chargers  29–27–1
| 
|-
| 
| style="| 
| style="| Chargers  21–6
| style="| Chargers  20–13
| Chargers  31–27–1
| 
|-

|-
| 
| style="| 
| style="| Chiefs  24–21
| style="| Chiefs  27–10
| Chargers  31–29–1
|
|-
| 
| style="| 
| style="| Chiefs  14–13
| style="| Chiefs  20–17(OT)
| Tie  31–31–1
| 
|-
| 
| style="| 
| style="| Chiefs  24–10
| style="| Chiefs  16–14
| Chiefs  33–31–1
| 
|- style="background:#f2f2f2; font-weight:bold;"
|  1992 Playoffs
| style="| 
| style="| Chargers 17–0
| 
|  Chiefs  33–32–1
|  AFC Wild Card round.  Only playoff meeting between the two teams.
|-
| 
| style="| 
| style="| Chiefs  17–14
| style="| Chiefs  28–24
| Chiefs  35–32–1
| 
|-
| 
| style="| 
| style="| Chargers  20–6
| style="| Chargers  14–13
| Chiefs  35–34–1
| Chargers lose Super Bowl XXIX.
|-
| 
| style="| 
| style="| Chiefs  22–7
| style="| Chiefs  29–23(OT)
| Chiefs  37–34–1
|
|-
| 
| style="| 
| style="| Chargers  22–19
| style="| Chargers  28–14
| Chiefs  37–36–1
|  
|-
| 
| style="| 
| style="| Chiefs  29–7
| style="| Chiefs  31–3
| Chiefs  39–36–1
| 
|-
| 
| Tie 1–1
| style="| Chargers  38–37
| style="| Chiefs  23–7
| Chiefs  40–37–1
| First season series split since 1987.
|-
| 
| Tie 1–1
| style="| Chargers  28–9
| style="| Chiefs  34–0
| Chiefs  41–38–1
| 
|-

|-
| 
| Tie 1–1
| style="| Chargers  17–16
| style="| Chiefs  42–10
| Chiefs  42–39–1
| 
|-
| 
| style="| 
| style="| Chiefs  25–20
| style="| Chiefs  20–17
| Chiefs  44–39–1
| 
|-
| 
| Tie 1–1
| style="| Chargers  35–34
| style="| Chiefs  24–22
| Chiefs  45–40–1
| Former Chiefs head coach Marty Schottenheimer becomes head coach of the Chargers.
|-
| 
| style="| 
| style="| Chiefs  28–24
| style="| Chiefs  27–14
| Chiefs  47–40–1
| 
|-
| 
| style="| 
| style="| Chargers  24–17
| style="| Chargers  34–31
| Chiefs  47–42–1
| 
|-
| 
| Tie 1–1
| style="| Chargers  28–20
| style="| Chiefs  20–7
| Chiefs  48–43–1
|
|-
| 
| Tie 1–1
| style="| Chargers  20–9
| style="| Chiefs  30–27
| Chiefs  49–44–1
| Chiefs win game in Kansas City on last-second field goal by Lawrence Tynes, who had missed two kicks earlier in the game.
|-
| 
| Tie 1–1
| style="| Chiefs  30–16
| style="| Chargers  24–10
| Chiefs  50–45–1
| 
|-
| 
| style="| 
| style="| Chargers  20–19
| style="| Chargers  22–21
| Chiefs  50–47–1
| Chargers come back from down 21–3 late in the third quarter in the game in Kansas City.
|-
| 
| style="| 
| style="| Chargers  43–14
| style="| Chargers  37–7
| Chiefs  50–49–1
| 
|-

|-
| 
| Tie 1–1
| style="| Chargers  31–0
| style="| Chiefs  21–14
| Chiefs  51–50–1
| 
|-
| 
| Tie 1–1
| style="| Chargers  20–17
| style="| Chiefs  23–20(OT)
| Chiefs  52–51–1
| Philip Rivers fumbles snap on kneel down late in game in Kansas City with game tied at 20. Chiefs win it on a field goal in overtime. The loss effectively ends the Chargers hopes of the AFC West Crown, as they, the Broncos, and Raiders all finished 8-8, but the Broncos won the tiebreaker over the Chargers due to tiebreakers. 
|-
| 
| style="| 
| style="| Chargers  31–13
| style="| Chargers  37–20
| Chargers  53–52–1
| 
|-
| 
| style="| 
| style="| Chargers  27–24(OT)
| style="| Chargers  41–38
| Chargers  55–52–1
| Chargers clinch playoff berth in week 17 win over Chiefs in San Diego.
|-
| 
| style="| 
| style="| Chiefs  23–20
| style="| Chiefs  19–7
| Chargers  55–54–1
|
|-
| 
| style="| 
| style="| Chiefs  33–3
| style="| Chiefs  10–3
| Chiefs  56–55–1
| 
|-
| 
| style="| 
| style="| Chiefs  37–27
| style="| Chiefs  33–27(OT)
| Chiefs  58–55–1
|
|-
| 
| style="| 
| style="| Chiefs  24–10
| style="| Chiefs  30–13
| Chiefs  60–55–1
| Chargers move to Los Angeles.
|-
| 
| Tie 1–1
| style="| Chiefs  38–28
| style="| Chargers  29–28
| Chiefs  61–56–1 
| Chiefs win nine straight meetings from 2014 to 2018.  Chargers win in Kansas City on a last-minute touchdown and two-point conversion.
|-
| 
| style="| 
| style="| Chiefs  24–17*
| style="| Chiefs  31–21
| Chiefs  63–56–1
| Chargers' home game played in Estadio Azteca in Mexico City.  Chiefs win Super Bowl LIV.
|-

|-
| 
| Tie 1–1
| style="| Chiefs  23–20(OT)
| style="| Chargers  38–21
| Chiefs  64–57–1
| Chargers and Rams open SoFi Stadium.  The Chiefs–Chargers game in Los Angeles was the first Chargers' home game in the venue. Chiefs lose Super Bowl LV. 
|-
| 
| Tie 1–1
| style="| Chiefs  34–28(OT) 
| style="| Chargers  30–24
| Chiefs  65–58–1
|
|-
| 
| style="| 
| style="| Chiefs  30–27 
| style="| Chiefs  27–24
| Chiefs  67–58–1
| The Chiefs-Chargers game in Kansas City was the first Thursday Night Football game broadcast nationally and exclusively on Amazon Prime Video. Chiefs win Super Bowl LVII.
|- 

|-
| AFL regular season
| style="|Chiefs 10–9–1
| Chargers 5–4–1
| Chiefs 6–4
|
|-
| NFL regular season
| style="|Chiefs 57–48
| Tie 26–26
| Chiefs 31–22
| Chargers' home record includes the 2019 game played in Mexico City
|-
| AFL and NFL regular season
| style="|Chiefs 67–57–1
| Chargers 31–30–1 
| Chiefs 37–26
| 
|-
| NFL postseason
| style="|Chargers 1–0
| Chargers 1–0
| no games
| 1992 AFC Wild Card playoffs
|-
| Regular and postseason 
| style="|
| Chargers 32–30–1 
| Chiefs 37–26
| 
|-

Series leaders 
Statistics limited to Chargers-Chiefs regular season games. Correct through 2021 season.

Notes

References

External links
 Los Angeles Chargers' official website
 U-T San Diego – Chargers/NFL
 Pro Football Hall of Fame – Los Angeles Chargers team history
 Los Angeles Chargers at Sports E-Cyclopedia.org
 Kansas City Chiefs' official website
 The Kansas City Star – Chiefs' coverage
 Kansas City Chiefs at Sports E-Cyclopedia.org
 Pro Football Hall of Fame – Kansas City Chiefs' team history

Los Angeles Chargers
Kansas City Chiefs
National Football League rivalries
Kansas City Chiefs rivalries
Los Angeles Chargers rivalries